This is a list of public art in Blaenau Gwent, a county borough in south Wales that borders Monmouthshire and Torfaen to the east, Caerphilly to the west and Powys to the north. The area is governed by Blaenau Gwent County Borough Council. This list applies only to works of public art on permanent display in an outdoor public space and does not, for example, include artworks in museums.

Abertillery

Beaufort

Blaina

Brynmawr

Cwm

Ebbw Vale

Llanhilleth

Tredegar

References

Blaenau Gwent 
Public art